Tapan Sikdar (20 September 1944 – 2 June 2014) was a Union minister of state in the National Democratic Alliance government of India and a Bharatiya Janata Party politician. He was born on 20 September 1944 in Jessore. His father Dr. D. N. Sikdar was a physician. His mother's name was Bela Rani Sikdar. He was member of 12 and 13 Lok Sabha representing Dum Dum (Lok Sabha constituency) in West Bengal.

Tapan Shikdar died on 2 June 2014 in Delhi, AIIMS due to respiratory problems.

Positions held
1998                            Elected to 12th Lok Sabha
1998-99                       Member, Committee on External Affairs and its Sub-Committee-III;                 Member, Committee on Finance; Member, Consultative Committee, Ministry of Water Resources
1999                            Re-elected to 13th Lok Sabha (2nd term)
13 Oct. 1999-2002                Union Minister of State, Ministry of Communications
10 Jan - 30 June 2002  Union Minister of State,  Ministry of Communications and Information Technology
1 July 2002 -2004                 Union Minister of State, Ministry of Chemicals and Fertilizers (India)

He was Union Minister of Communications and Information Technology (India). Later he was Union Minister of State, Ministry of Chemicals and Fertilizers. He unsuccessfully contested the Dum Dum Lok Sabha constituency in the 2009 general election where the All India Trinamool Congress candidate (who won and became the MP) got 458,988 votes whereas the Communist Party of India (Marxist) candidate got 438,510 votes) and he polled only 55,679 votes.

Dr. Syamaprasad Jana Jagaran Manch
Dr. Syamaprasad Jana Jagaran Manch  is a forum of Bharatiya Janata Party (BJP) dissidents in the Indian state of West Bengal. The forum was launched on 5 December 2004 by former Union Minister Tapan Sikdar.

The organisation held its first convention in Kolkata on 8 March 2006.

The forum is named after Syama Prasad Mookerjee, the founder of Bharatiya Jana Sangh. Sikdar maintains that the organisation is apolitical (in the sense that it is not a political party), and that he still sympathises with BJP. The group campaigns against Bangladeshi immigration to West Bengal.

References

External links 

Biodata
Speeches

1944 births
2014 deaths
Bengali Hindus
People from West Bengal
India MPs 1998–1999
India MPs 1999–2004
Lok Sabha members from West Bengal
National Democratic Alliance candidates in the 2014 Indian general election
Respiratory disease deaths in India
Bharatiya Janata Party politicians from West Bengal
People from North 24 Parganas district